Kalpana Harshani Liyanarachchi (born 4 June 1973) is a Sri Lankan former cricketer who played as a right-handed batter and right-arm medium bowler. She appeared in one Test matches and 16 One Day Internationals for Sri Lanka between 1997 and 2000, including being part of their squads at the 1997 and 2000 World Cups. She played domestic cricket for Slimline Sports Club.

References

External links
 
 

1973 births
Living people
Cricketers from Colombo
Sri Lankan women cricketers
Sri Lanka women Test cricketers
Sri Lanka women One Day International cricketers
Slimline Sport Club women cricketers